Big Spring is an artesian spring in Siskiyou County, California.

References

Reference bibliography 

Unincorporated communities in Siskiyou County, California
Unincorporated communities in California